María De Lourdes Gallimore Campos (born 20 February 1989) is a Panamanian model and a pageant titleholder from Ciudad de Panamá, Panamá who was represented the Panamá in the Bellezas Panamá 2014 pageant, on July 13, 2014, and won the title of Miss Panamá Earth 2014.

References

External links
 Bellezas Panamá  official website

1989 births
Living people
Señorita Panamá
Panamanian beauty pageant winners
Miss Earth 2014 contestants
Panamanian female models